Antraigues may refer to:

Antraigues-sur-Volane, a former commune of France
Vallées-d'Antraigues-Asperjoc, a commune of France
Louis-Alexandre de Launay, comte d'Antraigues (1753–1812), French pamphleteer

See also
Entraigues (disambiguation)